Xincheng Dong station, is a station and a terminus of the Guangfo line of the Foshan Metro and Guangzhou Metro, located in Foshan's Shunde District. It started operations on 28 December 2016.

Station layout

Exits

References

Railway stations in China opened in 2016
Guangzhou Metro stations
Foshan Metro stations
Shunde District